Theodore Brentano (March 29, 1854 – July 2, 1940) was an American attorney and judge and the first U.S. ambassador to Hungary (his full title was Envoy Extraordinary and Minister Plenipotentiary). He was appointed to the position by Warren G. Harding.

Born in Kalamazoo, Michigan to Lorenzo Brentano and his wife Caroline, Theodore Brentano was educated in Chicago, Dresden and Zurich. He studied law at National University Law School (which later became George Washington University Law School). Brentano married Minnie Claussenius on May 17, 1887. He was admitted to the bar in 1882, became an assistant city attorney in 1888, and by 1890 was a Superior Court judge in Cook County, Illinois (he would go on to become chief justice). Brentano remained on the bench for thirty-one years.

In 1899 Brentano became the new treasurer and president of the Illinois Staats-Zeitung, the newspaper of which his father was editor during the Civil War, when the majority stockholders appointed a new board of directors and ousted former treasurer Charles Francis Pietsch.

Brentano was appointed as minister to Hungary on February 10, 1922, arrived in Budapest on May 10, presented his credentials on May 16, and served until May 6, 1927.

See also
Hungary – United States relations
United States Ambassador to Hungary
Illinois Staats-Zeitung

References

Further reading

 Peterecz, Zoltán. "Theodore Brentano – The first American minister for Hungary, 1922–1927" Hungarian Studies (Dec 2021) 35#1 pp 66-79.

External links
Profile from the U.S. Department of State

1854 births
1940 deaths
19th-century American judges
20th-century American diplomats
20th-century American judges
George Washington University Law School alumni
Illinois Republicans
Illinois state court judges
Lawyers from Chicago
People from Kalamazoo, Michigan
Ambassadors of the United States to Hungary
Superior court judges in the United States
Illinois Staats-Zeitung people